

The Lippisch P.15 was a proposed World War II German fighter aircraft.

Development
Alexander Lippisch designed it after inspecting the new Heinkel He 162 which he thought could be improved. The redesigned He 162 composed of the nose section of the Heinkel 162, the wings and tail of the Me 163C, a newly designed rear fuselage, and landing gear adapted from the Bf 109. Power was to be supplied by a single Heinkel HeS 011A turbojet contained within the rear fuselage, which was fed by two intakes buried in the wing roots.

Specifications

References

External links

Abandoned military aircraft projects of Germany
P.15